Greatest Hits was Phil Ochs' seventh LP and final studio album. Contrary to its title, it offered ten new tracks of material, mostly produced by Van Dyke Parks, and was released in 1970.

Music and lyrics 

Focusing more on country music than any other album in Ochs' canon, it featured an impressive number of musicians, including members of The Byrds and Elvis Presley's backing group alongside mainstays Lincoln Mayorga and Bob Rafkin. His lyrics were at their most self-referential and only one overtly political song appeared, "Ten Cents A Coup," which includes an earnest (though comical) spoken introduction strung together from two anti-war rallies.  The song is an ironic tribute to Richard Nixon and Spiro Agnew, who Ochs wryly suggests are more laughable than Laurel and Hardy.

Among the self-referential tracks was "Chords of Fame", which warned against the dangers of cult of personality.  "Boy In Ohio" saw Ochs looking back nostalgically at his childhood and "Jim Dean of Indiana" was a tale of James Dean's life, a tribute to him, written after Ochs had visited Dean's grave. "No More Songs" was the most telling of the tracks, as Ochs would release but five more studio tracks in his lifetime after 1970, never completing another studio album.

Cover 
The cover of the album is an homage to Elvis Presley's 1959 album 50,000,000 Elvis Fans Can't Be Wrong. The back cover of Greatest Hits featured the phrase "50 Phil Ochs Fans Can't Be Wrong". Ochs wore a gold lamé suit inspired by similar suits made famous by Presley, and hired Nudie Cohn, who made Presley's suits, to make his.

During his show at Carnegie Hall, which was recorded to be released as a live album, Ochs told the audience a story explaining his choice to wear the suit. He told them he had died in Chicago, in reference to the violence he witnessed during the protests at the 1968 Democratic National Convention. He said God gave him a chance to come back to earth as anyone he wanted and Ochs chose Presley. He added that if there was any hope for America it "relies on getting Elvis Presley to become Che Guevara". The suit is now part of the Phil Ochs archives at the Woody Guthrie Center in Tulsa, Oklahoma.

Track listing
All songs by Phil Ochs.

Side One
 "One Way Ticket Home" – 2:40
 "Jim Dean of Indiana" – 5:05
 "My Kingdom For A Car" – 2:53
 "Boy In Ohio" – 3:43
 "Gas Station Women" – 3:31

Side Two
 "Chords of Fame" – 3:33
 "Ten Cents A Coup" – 3:14
 "Bach, Beethoven, Mozart and Me" – 5:05
 "Basket in the Pool" – 3:40
 "No More Songs" – 4:31

Personnel (partial list)
Phil Ochs - guitar, piano, harmonica, vocals
Van Dyke Parks - producer, keyboards
Andrew Wickham - co-producer on "Gas Station Women" and "Chords of Fame" 
Clarence White - guitar, backing vocals
Laurindo Almeida - guitar
James Burton - guitar
Bob Rafkin - guitar, bass
Chris Ethridge - bass
Kenny Kaufman - bass
Gene Parsons - drums
Kevin Kelley - drums
Earl Ball - piano, arrangements
Lincoln Mayorga - keyboards
Mike Rubini - keyboards
Richard Rosmini - pedal steel, harmonica
Ry Cooder - mandolin on "One Way Ticket Home"
Don Rich - fiddle
Gary Coleman - percussion
Tom Scott - tenor saxophone
Bobby Bruce - violin
Anne Goodman - cello
Merry Clayton, Sherlie Matthews and Clydie King - backing vocals
Bobby Wayne and Jim Glover - harmony vocals
Bob Thompson - arrangements

References

1970 albums
Phil Ochs albums
A&M Records albums
Albums produced by Van Dyke Parks